Major General James Alexander Rowland Robertson,  (23 March 1910 – 11 February 2004) was a British Army officer who commanded the 17th Gurkha Division.

Military career
Educated at Epsom College and the Royal Military College, Sandhurst, Robertson was commissioned into the King's Own Yorkshire Light Infantry in 1930 and transferred into the 6th Gurkha Rifles on the North-West Frontier in 1931. He served in the Second World War as Brigade Major of the 1st (Maymyo) Brigade and then as Brigade Major of the 106th Indian Infantry Brigade before becoming Commanding Officer of 1st Battalion the 7th Gurkha Rifles in Burma in February 1944. In May 1944 his leadership was such that the battalion defended its position under constant fire on the Tiddim-Imphal road and inflicted heavy casualties on the Japanese. He became Commander of 48th Indian Infantry Brigade in 1945 and took the surrender of the Japanese forces at Moulmein in South Burma later that year.

After a tour as an instructor at the Staff College, Quetta, he was appointed Commanding Officer of 1st Battalion 6th Gurkha Rifles in 1947 and brigadier on the General Staff at Malaya Command in 1948 in which roles he saw service during the Malayan Emergency. He undertook staff duties at the War Office in the UK from 1950 at Headquarters I (British) Corps in Germany from 1952. He became Commander of 51st Infantry Brigade in the Middle East in 1955 and Commander Land Forces Persian Gulf in 1957 leading the units which re-took Nizwa from the Omani rebels. He went on to be General Officer Commanding 17th Gurkha Division and major general commanding the Brigade of Gurkhas in 1958 and General Officer Commanding Land Forces at Middle East Command in 1961. His last appointment was as Gurkha Liaison Officer at the War Office in 1963 before retiring in 1964.

In retirement he became director of personnel for the Navy, Army and Air Force Institutes. He was also a Deputy Lieutenant of Greater London.

Family
In 1949 he married Ann Tosswill, who died of polio shortly after their marriage. In 1973 he married Joan Wills (née Abercromby).

References

 

1910 births
2004 deaths
Academics of the Staff College, Quetta
British Army major generals
Companions of the Order of the Bath
Commanders of the Order of the British Empire
Companions of the Distinguished Service Order
Deputy Lieutenants of Greater London
People educated at Epsom College
Graduates of the Royal Military College, Sandhurst
Indian Army personnel of World War II
British Army personnel of the Malayan Emergency
British Indian Army officers
King's Own Yorkshire Light Infantry officers
People educated at Aysgarth School